Vietnam's Next Top Model, Cycle 7 is  the seventh season of Vietnam's Next Top Model. It premiered on July 17, 2016 on VTV3. For the fourth time, males were still featured as part of the show. This year, host Phạm Thị Thanh Hằng and Samuel Hoàng reprised their roles in the judging panel. Fashion designer Lý Quí Khánh and fashion stylist & Editor-in-Chief of Đẹp Magazine Hà Đỗ were introduced as new judges. This season's theme is: "Break The Rules: #PhaBoMoiGioiHan".

The winner was 22 year-old Nguyễn Thị Ngọc Châu from Tây Ninh. In 2018, she was crowned Miss Supranational Vietnam, and represented Vietnam to compete Miss Supranational 2019 where she placed Top 10 and Miss Supranational Asia. In 2022, she was crowned Miss Universe Vietnam and is set to represent Vietnam at Miss Universe 2022.

Trần Thị Thùy Trâm will compete in the All-stars season of this series, where she placed 11th/10th.

6th/7th-placed alumnus Nguyen Thieu Lan competed in The Face Vietnam (season 2) where she placed 12th.

9th-placed alumnus Vu Tran Kim Nha was one of the founding members of the Social Media Production Team, BB&BG Entertainment.

Overview

Requirements
All applying contestants for the show had to meet the following requirements:
 Young men and women had to be Vietnamese citizens or foreigners of Vietnamese origin.
 Over the age of 18.
 Not be managed exclusively by companies, agencies, or products. 
 Have no criminal record

Auditions

Prizes
The winner will receive the following prizes are:
 2-year modelling contract with BeU Models
 A cover spread of Harper's Bazaar Vietnam magazine
 A 1-year contract with IVYmoda worth VND 500 million.
 A 1-year membership worth VND 200 million courtesy of Elite Fitness & Spa.
 VND 100 million worth of PNJ Jewellry.
 VND 100 million worth of package by Pho Xinh furniture
 A contract with Hanvico My Youth furniture cover collection worth VND 100 million.
 Will be opening at Vietnam International Fashion week on November 1–6, 2016 at Hanoi.

Next Top Model Online
Similar to the last cycle, the organizers of the show began a contest named Next Top Model Online on Kenh14.vn. After the contest, the contestant with the highest number of votes will be allowed to advance to the model house. As a result, that was shown in this cycle's first episode, BB&BG actress and Social Media Personality Vu Tran Kim Nha from Ho Chi Minh City, who was 26 years old (as the oldest of all contestants in this cycle) was advanced to the bikini round leading her advancement to the selection of Top 24 semifinalists from the pool of auditionees, both online & casting venues.

Contestants

Episodes

Episode 1
Original Airdate: 

This was the casting episode. It shows that many people who really wanted to aspire to become Vietnam's Next Top Model. The judges have their different reactions when it comes to modelling skills and talents of many aspirants. In the end, only eighteen out of multitudes of aspirants across Vietnam are chosen as the finalists of this cycle. These aspirants are selected in no particular order by performance level that they achieved.

Advanced: Bùi Huy Dương, Phạm Gia Long, Hoàng Minh Tùng, Nguyễn Duy Minh, Nguyễn Huy Quang, Nguyễn Minh Phong, Trương Bùi Hoai Nam, Trần Thị Thùy Trâm, Trần Thị Thùy Trang, Hà Thị Út Trang, Vũ Trần Kim Nhã, Nguyễn Thị Thùy Dung, Nguyễn Thị Phương, La Thanh Thanh, Nguyễn Anh Thư, Nguyễn Thiếu Lan, Nguyễn Thị Ngọc Châu & Trịnh Thu Hường

Episode 2
Original Airdate: 

After selecting the 18 appointed finalists after the casting episode, the finalists moved into Phu Long Dragon Hills Suites & Residences, which was used in cycle 6. The next day, the boys & girls were shocked to know that they will have a makeover. Back at the model suites, tension rises between Thanh & Trâm during the house meeting.

At the photo shoot, the saw a ceiling-suspended 3-dimensional pyramid or cube that was made of circular tube bars which are assembled as one & they used this as a gymnastic exhibition. Some of them could adapt to learn new things. A lot of them struggled, especially for Thuy Dung & Gia Long who performed the worst leading to disqualification. But except for one of them, Thanh Thanh impressed the judges the most, despite of being the shortest among the contestants, who stood at 5 feet and 1/2 inches in height. At the end of the episode, Gia Long & Thuy Dung bid goodbye to the 16 remaining contestants, packed their bags & left the competition.

The next day, Lý Quí Khánh came to the model suites to announce who has won the best photo and Thanh is the one who got the best photo of the week. 

Best photo: La Thanh Thanh
Eliminated outside of judging panel: Phạm Gia Long & Nguyễn Thị Thùy Dung
Featured Photographer: Mạnh Bi

Episode 3
Original Airdate: 

On the next day, they saw the flatscreen TV displaying Thanh Thanh's image for her best performance & "Thank You" messages from Pham Gia Long & Nguyen Thi Thuy Dung that lead them to emotional cry when they bid farewell.

At the photo shoot, they split up into 8 pairs which consist of a combination of a man and a woman or an all-female or all-male combination. Only 6 pairs made up of man & woman partnership as couples while the 2 pairs made up of all-female best friends.

At the deliberation panel, Phuong, Nam, Duong, Tung, Chau, Phong, Quang & Thanh impressed the judges for showing up their best creative shots by their inventive poses, especially Phuong, who garnered the best photo of the week for her strong performance with Nam, who is behind her, gains a runner-up photo of this week. The 6 women, Huong, Lan, Thuy Trang, Nha, Ut Trang & Thu received a "just right" feedback because they have some uncertain factors that they need to improve well. Minh & Tram performed the worst in the photo shoot because they thought way too much with several uncertain factors that brought them to bottom two. At the end of deliberation, Minh received the last photo, the host announced that it was a non-elimination episode.

First call-out: Nguyễn Thị Phương
Non-elimination bottom two: Nguyễn Duy Minh & Trần Thị Thùy Trâm
Featured Photographer: Samuel Hoàng

Episode 4
Original Airdate: 

Inside the model suite, everyone cheered for joy because none of them left the competition, especially Thuy Tram who cries for joy.

At the photo shoot, they have to wear something colorful for their cool, cute & playful concepts especially for the red-and-white vertical wall stripes with a hot air balloon on it. They all have to look quirky when they jumped on the trampoline to show off their clothes with flying colors.

At the deliberation panel, half of them impressed the judges, Huy Quang gets the best photo of the week and Thuy Tram on her rapidly massive improvements by getting a runner-up photo. The next four persons including Kim Nha who was included in the bottom five got fair comments from the judges. While Anh Thu, Duy Minh, Hoai Nam & Ut Trang have lots of factors that they lacked in improvement leading themselves to bottom five with Kim Nha. Thanh Hang announced that there would be a triple elimination this week. Kim Nha was called first, while Anh Thu received the 13th and last photo of this week. Eliminating  Duy Minh, Hoai Nam & Ut Trang, they returned to the model house to pack their bags and left the competition.

First call-out: Nguyễn Huy Quang
Bottom five: Vu Tran Kim Nha, Nguyễn Anh Thư, Nguyễn Duy Minh, Trương Bùi Hoài Nam & Hà Thị Út Trang 
Eliminated: Nguyễn Duy Minh, Trương Bùi Hoài Nam & Hà Thị Út Trang
Featured Photographer: Phan Võ

Episode 5
Original Airdate: 

Back in the model suite where Minh, Nam & Ut Trang composed their messages in order to pack their bags and leave before the 13 remaining contestants arrive. Shortly followed by the arrival of the 13 contestants to the model house where the Thank You messages composed by Minh, Nam & Ut Trang were displayed on the screen that brought their emotions to tears, especially Lan's because she loved Minh the most. After a couple of minutes, Quang's best photo was displayed on the screen.

There were some mishaps happening in the model house. At night after the triple elimination, Lan  fainted due to her emotional breakdown by Minh's elimination and went to the hospital along with few of her co-models who assisted her. Lan confirmed that she'd dropout of this week's photo shoot for her to take rest. The next morning, Tram complains a lot with anger and tears. And she thought that Nha was annoying her. Tram burst out her emotions where one of her closest friends, Lan, who is in the hospital which made herself an introvert.

At the photo shoot, the activity of this photo shoot is to showcase their high fashion dresses underwater for their ethereal experience. Some of them enjoyed it and they could invent the poses whatever they want, some of them could swim while others were struggling, especially Huong whose performance is very hard to find what factor can be the key to her improvement.

At the deliberation panel, Nha climbs her way up with 11 notches by her exceptionally ethereal aura, leading her to this week's best-photo victory. Thanh, Quang, Duong, Chau, Phuong & Tung impressed the judges easily, especially Thanh who gained the runner-up photo despite of her short height to face her fears in the underwater world. Phong, Thuy Trang, Thu & Tram got fair comments because they fared well for their performances for them not to be pruned in the elimination, while Lan (who is in a temporary dropout) & Huong (is the one who) struggled the most, found themselves in the bottom two. But when Thanh Hang reveals the 12th and final best photo, both of them are safe. If the two persons at the bottom group are both saved by revealing the last photo, Non-elimination bottom group happens.

First call-out: Vũ Trần Kim Nhã
Non-elimination Bottom Two: Trịnh Thu Hường & Nguyễn Thiếu Lan
Featured Photographer: Samuel Hoàng, Lee Nguyễn
Guest Judge:

Episode 6
Original Airdate: 

Inside the model suite, everyone felt their joy of victory when Lan & Huong are both saved in the elimination. The next day, they have to show their entrepreneurial skills when they sell fruits, vegetables & flowers.

In the challenge, 13 contestants received a voice-over call from a customer in order to buy something from them. When he speaks fluent English, Phuong (together with Nha) & Thanh (together with Huong) showed up their English-speaking abilities while others are in Vietnamese Language. In the end, Phuong & Nha won a special reward, a dinner for two at the hotel.

At the photo shoot, they went to circus in order to pose at the hanging ladder together with a metal hoop that is blazed with fire to determine how courageous they are when they face their fear of heights. Tram cried a lot when there can be some uncertainties pushing to her, but she risked it all leaving to another runner-up photo victory behind Quang (who gains a second best photo because of his good variety of looks portrayed on each photo shoot). Behind Quang & Tram, Phuong, Phong, Nha, Huong, Thanh, Chau, Duong and Tung followed. Lan, Trang & Thu fell down in the bottom 3, especially, Lan & Thu for the second time in the danger zone for elimination. Thanh Hang saw all 3 of them if they are determined to be in the running for the next challenge and photo shoot, but in the end, Lan & Trang completed the top 12 spots, leaving Thu as the 6th contestant to be eliminated.

Challenge winner: Nguyễn Thị Phương
First call-out: Nguyễn Huy Quang
Bottom three: Nguyễn Thị Thiếu Lan, Nguyễn Anh Thư & Trần Thị Thùy Trang
Eliminated: Nguyễn Anh Thư
Featured photographer: Minduke 
Guest judge: Phạm Hồng Thúy Vân

Episode 7
Original Airdate: 

In the morning, everybody is well prepared for the challenge. It's just like the format of Amazing Race where different pitstops were assigned. But in a Top Model-twist, each pitstop gives time for them to decide what clothing and accessory they want to wear.

For the photo shoot, PNJ is the official jewellery sponsor of this show for them to be equipped for their TV commercial to determine who will be the ambassador for PNJ. Once they wore it, high-fashion took them to a whole new level to boost up their glamour inside and out!

Fashion Designer Ly Qui Khanh divided the 12 remaining contestants into 2 teams, where each group consists of 6 people. Blue Team consists of Tung, Chau, Tram, Thanh, Lan & Phong, while Quang, Huong, Trang, Duong, Phuong & Nha are belong to Red Team. This grouping applies to both segments of the said episode, in challenge & photo shoot. In the challenge, Blue Team won, while in the photo shoot, Red Team won by receiving an immunity reward from this episode's elimination. In the deliberation, aside from Red Team's immunity group photo, Thanh, Phong, Lan & Tram followed. Chau & Tung fell out in the bottom 2 to determine who will gain this week's best photo as Hang's last call out for the top achiever, Chau earned her 1st best photo, while Tung fell out & ended up in 12th place.

Challenge winner: La Thanh Thanh, Nguyễn Thị Ngọc Châu, Hoàng Minh Tùng, Nguyễn Thiếu Lan, Trần Thị Thuỳ Trâm, Nguyễn Minh Phong
First call-out: Nguyễn Thị Ngọc Châu
Bottom two: Hoàng Minh Tùng & Trần Thị Thùy Trâm
Eliminated: Hoàng Minh Tùng
Guest judge:

Episode 8
Original Airdate: 

Eleven remaining contestants went back to the model house to see Tung's message, that may lead to Chau's emotional breakdown. That's why Chau felt so special to Tung, just like what happened to Lan on the 5th episode before she got fainted due to Minh's departure with Ut Trang & Nam.

The next day, when Hoang Thuy arrived in the model house to talk about their improved catwalk practices for them to be equipped in the challenge before they went to Phan Thiet City sand dunes. When they practice their catwalking movement, Thuy Trang struggled, whereas Thanh & Tram, Huong, Duong, Quang, Phong, Nha, Phuong, Chau & Lan were impressed by Thuy. Later on, Trang improved due to Quang & Huong's concerns.

As they arrived in Phan Thiet City sand dunes together with Samuel, Hang followed by taking an ATV ride. There can be not just one, but two challenges that they need to test themselves. First challenge would be walking on the sand dunes by carrying the libra scale balance without the support. The starting point would be the blue flag while the red flag would be its terminal point. Phong & Phuong got a just right comment, Quang, Duong & Lan got a minimal concern from Hang while Thanh, Chau, Tram, Nha & Huong stood positive and eager to face new challenges as Hang is speechless for a great impression and Trang struggles the most because she didn't carry the libra scale correctly due to heavy weights and poor catwalks. As altogether went to red flag, they are surprised that there would be another challenge for them, is to pose at the back side of a driver when the ATV is kept on moving at the sand dunes as Samuel takes pictures to them.

Lan rides first to exhibit her variety of poses, followed by Chau, Phong, Huong, Trang (who raised her both arms to fly the sleeved tassels on it as she flies like an eagle), Tram (who struggled first but later on, improved), Phuong (who raised her scarf for her exceptional aura), Thanh (despite for her short height), Quang (who is ever since adventurous and has an exciting behavior), Duong & Nha (who struggles the most). As Samuel expressed his thanks to the guest photographer for the benefit of the contestants, there can be no winners of the challenge announced since the second challenge is the combination/crossover between the second challenge and a pre-photo shoot as all of them made their way to the next photo shoot.

At the photo shoot, they were surprised that there would be a terrarium (with the hole at the bottom for them to insert his/her head as a sign of surprise) that is filled with sands, plants & some creepy animals like iguana, snake, baby crocodiles, frog and even large spiders that will be given to them. Nha was the first one to encounter with an iguana and a large spider for her beauty shots. Phong followed next with a baby crocodile, Tram with a snake (but she was frightened at first) and a spider (for her courageous dare), Quang with a baby crocodile and a spider, Trang with a spider (but she was terrified and then, struggled), Lan with a toad & a fast-running spider (also frightened and struggled like Trang), Thanh with a snake (because she loves it) and an iguana (that made her way to success by being courageous), Duong with a baby crocodile and a spider, Chau with an iguana and a spider, Phuong with an iguana & a snake (that made her shocked and struggled like Lan & Trang) & lastly, Huong with a crawling snake (that made her struggled at first, but later on, she ended up with a courage).

At the deliberation panel, Phong & Chau made a just right feedback, Nha, Tram, Phuong, Duong, Lan & especially Trang struggled due to some uncertainties & Huong, Quang & Thanh were impressed by the judges for their excellence. For the call-out order announcement, Thanh gained her second victorious picture, made her mark as the second finalist to gain second best photo after Quang on episode 6. Followed by Quang, Huong, Phuong, Chau, Trang, & Lan in the safe position while Nha, Duong, Phuong & Tram lead themselves into the danger zone. In the end, Nha & Tram got their tied-last-saved result whilst Duong & Phuong are the next ones to be eliminated. As a result, Only half of the 18 finalists in the show are still in the running for the succeeding challenges & photo shoots.

First call-out: La Thanh Thanh
Bottom four: Bùi Huy Dương, Nguyễn Thị Phương, Trần Thị Thùy Trâm & Vũ Trần Kim Nhã
Eliminated: Bùi Huy Dương & Nguyễn Thị Phương
Featured photographer: Minduke 
Guest judge: Hoàng Thị Thùy

Episode 9
Original Airdate: 

After Duong & Phuong departed, Nha felt so bad about their elimination because she saw that both of them portray a good variety of poses in the photo shoot, most especially Phuong in speaking English fluently.

At the challenge, the 9 remaining finalist went to the runway hill platform first to climb up until they go down, the next would be the seesaw platform for them to reach the turntables to stay for one complete rotation and the icy carpet to brave the slippery floor for them to be better models. Nha, Quang, Thanh, Trang T. & Huong struggled, Lan & Phong made a good performance, Chau frightened at first, but as she moves forward, she improved so well while Tram made a solution to each obstacle that makes her victorious in the challenge.

In the photo shoot, they went to Nha Trang with two of the series' winners, Ta Quang Hung (from cycle 5) & Nguyễn Thị Hương Ly (from cycle 6) made their guest appearance for their commercial project from Hanvico furnishings. Hung partners with Huong, Nha, Tram, Lan, Chau & Thanh while Ly partners with Phong & Quang. Chau made a mark for the 2nd victory as judges impressed her the most. Followed by Huong, Thanh, Tram, Lan, Phong & Quang for their good performance, while Trang & Nha fell down in the bottom 2. In a unanimous decision, Trang stayed in the running while Nha is the 10th person to be eliminated, making everyone felt sad when she departed.

Challenge winner: Trần Thị Thuỳ Trâm
First call-out: Nguyễn Thị Ngọc Châu
Bottom two: Trần Thị Thùy Trang & Vũ Trần Kim Nhã
Eliminated: Vũ Trần Kim Nhã
Featured photographer: Mạnh Bi
Guest judge: Tạ Quang Hùng, Nguyễn Thị Hương Ly

Episode 10
Original Airdate: 

After Kim Nha's departure, Thanh Thanh will also leave before the challenge was started because she is in need for her spiritual support and went home to Binh Duong within 24 hours to reunite with her family. The next day, Actress Angela Phuong Trinh made an acting challenge together with the 8 remaining contestants. Chau, Huong & Quang made all of their acting efforts for them to excel this challenge. Trang, Lan & Tram made a good movement and dialogue, whereas Phong struggled a lot due to his "very soft" voice that makes his acting a big need for his improvement. In the end, Chau won the challenge where she got two best photos on episodes 7 & 9.

As they celebrate the Mooncake Festival, all 8 finalists went to Water Puppet Theatre to know the stories first that portrayed in a theatrical play before they used these props and effects for their poses in coincidence with the said festival. As a result, after she suffered in the bottom group in episodes 6 & 9, Trang made a mark in this episode due to her large improvement in portraying a good variety of poses. Subsequently, Phuong, Quang, Chau & Thanh delivered their good performance as well that brought Huong, Tram & Lan in a bottom three for their oversimplified expression which don't gave life to their photos. Huong & Lan got a tied-last-saved result whilst Tram lost in a unanimous decision. Thanh cried a lot as Tram leaves because she feels that she is the strongest connector for Tram's friendship. Chau as well, but later comforted Thanh from their grief.

Challenge winner: Nguyễn Thị Ngọc Châu
First call-out:  Trần Thị Thùy Trang
Bottom three: Trịnh Thu Hường, Nguyễn Thiếu Lan & Trần Thị Thuỳ Trâm
Eliminated: Trần Thị Thuỳ Trâm
Featured photographer: Trí Nghĩa
Guest judge: Angela Phương Trinh

Episode 11
Original Airdate: 

Prior to the challenge shoot, Phong confirms his leave of absence in order to reunite with his family in Tien Giang province. The next day, Ha Do conducted a meeting with Huong, Chau, Trang, Lan, Thanh & Quang about Tresemme commercial challenge shoot where they can play their hair when the electric fan turned on at its highest speed for their hair to fly. Lan, Chau, Quang & Thanh impressed Ha Do, especially when Thanh excels the most among all of them that may led her to challenge win whilst Trang & Huong struggled at first, but made it into a successful end of their challenge shoot.

Multimedia JSC President & Chief Executive Officer Le Thi Quynh Trang went there to conduct a runway commercial shoot. Quang & Chau impressed the judges yet garnered an okay comment, Trang, Phong & Huong struggled and doesn't give life to their commercial shoots, Lan overpowered high fashion statement over her facial expression & Thanh sets herself into a higher notch of her performance that gave zest to her commercial that led to her 3rd best photo victory, making her mark to become the strongest contestant in this cycle. After Thanh (who gained 3 best photos), Quang & Chau followed (with 2 best photos each) leading Trang, Huong, Lan & Phong to bottom 4 in order that only one of the contestants could complete the final 4 slots. Thanh Hang saw in the tally of best photos that Trang recently earned her first and only best photo on Episode 10 that made her mark in this episode that she will complete the top 4 slot, leaving Phong, Huong & Lan (all with no best photo victories) eliminated as an achievement-based result.

After the elimination, the final 4 contestants flown to Sydney for another project, Canifa 2016/2017 Fall/Winter series catalogue, where all 4 of them will become its brand ambassadors for this year in this upcoming campaign.

Challenge winner: La Thanh Thanh 
First call-out: La Thanh Thanh
Bottom four: Trịnh Thu Hường, Nguyễn Thiếu Lan, Nguyễn Minh Phong &  Trần Thị Thùy Trang
Eliminated: Trịnh Thu Hường, Nguyễn Thiếu Lan & Nguyễn Minh Phong
Guest judge: Lê Thị Quỳnh Trang

Episode 12
Original Airdate: 

In the live finale, singer Hoang Thuy Linh along with her back-up dancers made their impressive concert as a grand entrance to this live finale episode. Live finale host Tùng Leo reprised his role for the 3rd straight time by introducing himself first, then the judges (including Hang, the Host).

Prior to the revelation of voting results, 14 eliminated finalists came to runway again for their fashion competition where only one of them will be returned as a 5th contestant to reach the final round with the final 4 contestants. A contestant who earns the highest votes will be returned while the rest of them will be re-eliminated again if they gained the lowest votes.

According to Kenh14 website, the final voting result is shown in percentages instead of quantified tally of votes.

1. Nguyễn Minh Phong - 17.58%
2.  Vũ Trần Kim Nhã  - 12.03%
3. Nguyễn Duy Minh - 8.38%
4. Hoàng Minh Tùng - 7.86%
5. Nguyễn Thiếu Lan - 7.33%
6. Trương Bùi Hoài Nam - 3.85%
7. Nguyễn Thị Phuong - 3.22%
8. Bùi Huy Dương - 2.89%
9. Trần Thị Thùy Trâm - 2.58%
10. Trịnh Thu Hường - 2.23%
11. Hà Thị Út Trang - 1.42%
12. Nguyễn Anh Thư - 1.23%
13. Phạm Gia Long - 0.76%
14. Nguyễn Thị Thùy Dung - 0.63%

In the end, this percent-vote result revealed that Phong will be returned as a 5th contestant to be completed in the final round. This final showdown will be consisted of 2 parts, the Black & Red shades of fashion theme (for Top 5) & the big-mirror shot pose (for Top 3). After the first part of the finals was ended, Thanh, Quang & Chau will advance to the second part while Phong & Trang are eliminated. In the second part of this episode, all 3 remaining contestants impressed the judges well but they will determine who will be the winner of this cycle. The cover of Harper's Bazaar that was shown on the screen featuring the Top 5 contestants will reveal the winner, and that was Chau who came out to break the rules for her to win.

Returned:  Nguyễn Minh Phong
Final five: La Thanh Thanh, Nguyễn Huy Quang, Nguyễn Minh Phong, Nguyễn Thị Ngọc Châu & Trần Thị Thuỳ Trang
Eliminated: Nguyễn Minh Phong & Trần Thị Thuỳ Trang
Final three: La Thanh Thanh, Nguyễn Huy Quang & Nguyễn Thị Ngọc Châu
Vietnam's Next Top Model 2016: Nguyễn Thị Ngọc Châu
Featured photographer: Minduke 
Guest judge: Hoàng Thùy Linh, Tùng Leo

Summaries

Call-out order

 The contestant was immune from elimination
 The contestant won best photo of the week 
  The contestant was in danger of elimination
 The contestant was eliminated
 The contestant was originally eliminated from the competition but was saved
 The contestant was eliminated outside of the judging panel room
 The contestant won the competition

Average  call-out order
Episode 1,2 are not included

Photo shoot guide
Episode 1 photo shoot: Break the rules (casting) 
Episode 2 photo shoot: Posing on suspended geometric shapes
Episode 3 photo shoot: Couples in Vintage era
Episode 4 photo shoot: Falling in air as explorers
Episode 5 photo shoot: Underwater for Samsung Galaxy S7
Episode 6 photo shoot: Posing with eagle and fire in circus
Episode 7 commercial: Fashion film for PNJ Jewelry with one shot
Episode 8 photo shoot: Bald Beauty shot with reptiles 
Episode 9 photo shoot: Couples on the beach for CANIFA and My Youth - HANVICO
Episode 10 photo shoot: Mid-autumn festival couture
Episode 11 video shoot: Vietnam International Fashion Week promotions
Episode 12 photo shoot: Posing in Mirrors

Judges
 Phạm Thị Thanh Hằng (host)
 Samuel Hoàng
 Lý Quí Khánh
 Hà Đỗ

References

External links
Official website

Vietnam's Next Top Model
2010s Vietnamese television series
2016 Vietnamese television seasons